The universal destination of goods is a concept in Catholic theology, by which the Catholic Church professes that the goods of creation are destined for mankind as a whole, but also recognizes the individual right to private property.

The Catechism of the Catholic Church says:

In 1967, Pope Paul VI wrote in the encyclical Populorum progressio:

The Compendium of the Social Doctrine of the Church states:

See also

 Catholic social teaching
 Fratelli tutti § Private property
 Lockean proviso

References

Catholic social teaching
Public commons
Property